Gulen is a municipality in Sogn og Fjordane county, Norway.

Gulen or Gülen may also refer to:

People
 Fethullah Gülen (born 1941), Turkish preacher, author, and Islamic opinion leader
 Levent Gülen (born 1994), Turkish-Swiss footballer
 Nur Mustafa Gülen (born 1960), Turkish footballer and coach

Places

 Gulen Church, a church in Gulen municipality in Sogn og Fjordane county, Norway
 Gulen (fjord), a fjord in Bremanger municipality in Sogn og Fjordane county, Norway

Other uses
 Gülen movement, an Islamic movement founded and led by Fethullah Gülen

See also
Gullen (disambiguation)

Turkish-language surnames